Satish Kalsekar, (1942/1943 – 24 July 2021)  was a Marathi-language poet and essayist.  He was awarded the Sahitya Akademi Award in 2013 for his essay collection Vachanaryachi Rojanishee. His popular collections of poems are Indriyopnishad (इंद्रियोपनिषद), Sakshat (साक्षात) and Vilambit (विलंबित).

References

Recipients of the Sahitya Akademi Award in Marathi
Marathi-language writers
1940s births
2021 deaths
Year of birth missing